Obinna is an Igbo name, or sometimes surname. The name's origin is from the Igbo, located in south eastern Nigeria, and is usually male. Though people from other cultures may bear the name. The direct English translation is, "father's heart".
The name also means "Father's throne" depending on the context. This further explains why it's usually a name for the first sons of Igbo families. 
Notable people with the name include:

Given name
Obinna Anyanwu, (born 1983) Nigerian singer-songwriter, known as Waconzy
Obinna Chidoka (born 1974), Nigerian politician
Obinna Ekezie (born 1975), Nigerian basketball player
Obinna Eregbu (born 1969), Nigerian athlete
Obinna Eze (born 1998), Nigerian American football player
Obinna Metu (born 1988), Nigerian athlete
Obinna Nwachukwu (born 1992), Nigerian footballer
Obinna Nwaneri (born 1982), Nigerian footballer
Obinna Nwosu (born 1971), Nigerian basketball player, better known as Julius Nwosu
Obinna Oleka (born 1993), American basketball player

Surname
Mikel John Obi (born John Michael Nchekwube Obinna in 1987), Nigerian footballer playing for Chelsea F.C.
Eric Obinna Chukwunyelu (born 1982), Nigerian footballer playing for St. George's F.C.
Victor Nsofor Obinna (born 1987), Nigerian footballer playing for SV Darmstadt 98
Ezebuiro Obinna (1947–1999), Nigerian singer

See also
Obina, nickname of Brazilian footballer Manoel de Brito Filho

References

Igbo names
Igbo given names